Amara Konate (born 1 February 1999) is a Guinean footballer who plays as a midfielder for Italian  club Messina.

Personal life
Born in Nzérékoré, Guinea, Konate left his native country in 2017 to move to Europe, crossing the Mediterranean Sea via Libya and then finally settling down to Italy. After landing to Catania, he was moved to an immigration center in Cassino, where he started playing football with a local team, despite not having ever seriously played the game before.

Career

Perugia
While in Cassino, he was noticed by a football agent, who proposed him to Perugia; on his trial, he convinced the club managers to sign him, joining the club's Under-19 squad in the 2017–18 season.

Loan to Rieti
On 1 October 2018, Serie C club Rieti officially announced that Konate joined them on a season-long loan. He made his Serie C debut for Rieti earlier, on 29 September 2018 in a game against Cavese as a 90th-minute substitute for Boubakary Diarra.

Messina
On 30 July 2021 he joined Messina.

References

External links
 

1999 births
Living people
People from Nzérékoré
Guinean footballers
Association football midfielders
Serie B players
Serie C players
A.C. Perugia Calcio players
F.C. Rieti players
A.C.R. Messina players
Guinean expatriate footballers
Guinean expatriate sportspeople in Italy
Expatriate footballers in Italy